Earl Sylvester "Ollie" Hanson (January 19, 1896 – August 19, 1951) was an American Major League Baseball pitcher who played for the Chicago Cubs in .

External links

Chicago Cubs players
1890s births
1951 deaths
Baseball players from Massachusetts